Michael John Izen (born January 12, 1967) is an American bishop-elect of the Roman Catholic Church named as an auxiliary bishop for the Archdiocese of Saint Paul and Minneapolis in Minnesota by Pope Francis on January 5, 2023.

Biography

Izen was born on January 12, 1967, to John and JoAnna Izen. He is the youngest of six children, and of Lebanese descent. He grew up in Fairmont, Minnesota and attended Fairmont High School. He attended St. John's University in Collegeville, MN, studying mathematics and computer science. After graduation, he worked for 3M as a systems analyst. After nine years at 3M, he entered seminary, attending Saint John Vianney Seminary for philosophy and Saint Paul Seminary for theology. He was ordained on May 28, 2005.

After his ordination, he served at Divine Mercy in Faribault from 2005 to 2007 as an associate pastor. He was pastor of St. Timothy in Maple Lake from 2007 to 2012, pastor of St. Raphael's in Crystal from 2012 to 2015, and pastor of the parishes of St. Michael and St. Mary's in Stillwater from 2015 until his consecration as bishop.

Pope Francis appointed Izen auxiliary bishop for the Archdiocese of Saint Paul and Minneapolis on January 5, 2023. On April 11, 2023, Izen will be consecrated as a bishop.

See also

 Catholic Church hierarchy
 Catholic Church in the United States
 Historical list of the Catholic bishops of the United States
 List of Catholic bishops of the United States
 Lists of patriarchs, archbishops, and bishops

References

External links
Roman Catholic Archdiocese of Saint Paul and Minneapolis Official Site

1967 births
Living people
American Roman Catholic priests
Bishops appointed by Pope Francis
Clergy from Minneapolis
University of St. Thomas (Minnesota) alumni